Donald Neil Plett (born May 14, 1950) is a Canadian senator who has served as the leader of the Opposition in the Canadian Senate since November 5, 2019. He is the founding president of the National Council of the Conservative Party of Canada and the longest serving individual to have held this position.

Early life 
From 1987 to 2007 Plett, was owner and manager of Landmark Mechanical, a heating and ventilation company in Landmark, Manitoba, that was started by his father Archie Plett in 1957. He stepped down as manager in 2007 and his sons continue in the family business.

According to the Senate website Plett,

His father Archie, a lifelong Conservative, introduced Plett to the world of politics when he was just fifteen. He mentored and encouraged him and in 1965 Plett worked as a youth volunteer on the Honourable Jake Epp's federal campaign.

In 2000 Plett successfully managed the Vic Toews Canadian Alliance campaign where Toews defeated incumbent Liberal MP David Iftody by a large margin.

Plett became interim president of the Conservative Party of Canada at its creation in 2003 from the merger of the Canadian Alliance and the Progressive Conservative Party of Canada and was officially elected to the position in at the party's first policy convention in 2005, defeating Montreal lawyer Brian Mitchell. He was succeeded by John Walsh in 2009.

Senate career 
On August 27, 2009, the office of Prime Minister Stephen Harper announced that Plett was among nine new appointees to the Senate. His is one of many appointments made in thanks to service to the governing Conservative Party. Other appointees include Carolyn Stewart-Olsen, the prime minister's former press secretary, and Doug Finley, former Conservative Party chair.

Senator Plett was appointed Opposition Whip for the Conservative Senate Caucus and serves on the Standing Senate Committee on Legal & Constitutional Affairs and Agriculture & Forestry. He is also Chair of the Advisory Working Group tasked with studying and recommending changes to the Senate's administrative rules.

Plett serves as co-chair of the Canada-China Legislative Association a non-partisan forum established in 1998 for the discussion of bilateral and multilateral issues concerning Canada and the People's Republic of China. On 1 October 2014 the Canada-China Foreign Investment Promotion and Protection Agreement (FIPA) came into force. This date was announced by International Trade Minister Ed Fast in a news release on 12 September 2014.

In a rare move Plett spoke out against the motion into the Senate to suspend Mike Duffy, Pamela Wallin and Patrick Brazeau without pay before a single charge had been laid. Plett, calling on fairness and justice, argued, "Honourable Senators, just because something is within our rights, does not make it the right thing to do." National Post journalist observed that Don Plett, the owner of a plumbing business from Landmark, Manitoba, is representative of the base of the Conservative party.

In 2017, Plett defended fellow Conservative Senator Lynn Beyak following Beyak's controversial statements in support of Canadian Indian residential schools.

In 2019, Plett was elected by colleagues as the Leader of the Opposition in the Senate, succeeding Larry Smith.

In 2020, Pletts voiced support for Donald Trump and the Republican Party in the 2020 United States presidential election and Senate elections.

In December 2020, Plett vacationed to Mexico during the COVID-19 pandemic, despite government warnings advising against such trips. Plett returned to Canada on December 31 after reconsidering his decision. Earlier that year he'd co-signed a directive barring all MPs and senators from travelling outside Canada as part of interparliamentary delegations.

References

References

External links 
 

1950 births
Living people
Canadian Mennonites
Canadian political consultants
Canadian senators from Manitoba
Conservative Party of Canada senators
People from Eastman Region, Manitoba
21st-century Canadian politicians